The 1989 Nabisco Masters were tennis tournaments played on indoor carpet courts at Madison Square Garden in New York City, New York, United States and at the Royal Albert Hall in London, United Kingdom. It was the 20th edition of the year-end singles championships, the 16th edition of the year-end doubles championships, and both tournaments were part of the 1989 Nabisco Grand Prix. The singles championships were held in New York from November 27 through December 3, 1989, while the doubles championship were held in London from December 6 through December 10, 1989.

Finals

Singles

 Stefan Edberg defeated  Boris Becker, 4–6, 7–6(8–6), 6–3, 6–1.
 It was Edberg's 2nd title of the year and the 35th of his career.

Doubles

 Jim Grabb /  Patrick McEnroe defeated  John Fitzgerald /  Anders Järryd, 7–5, 7–6, 5–7, 6–3.
 It was Grabb's 2nd title of the year and the 5th of his career. It was McEnroe's 2nd title of the year and the 4th of his career.

References

External links
 Official website

 
Nabisco Masters
Grand Prix tennis circuit year-end championships
Tennis tournaments in New York City
Nabisco Masters
Nabisco Masters
Nabisco Masters
Tennis in London
Nabisco Masters
Nabisco Masters
Nabisco Masters